Clifford Wendell Hicks, Jr. (born August 18, 1964) is a former cornerback American football defensive back who played for four NFL teams from (1987–1995).  Before his NFL career, he played for the University of Oregon and was selected by the Los Angeles Rams in the 3rd round of the 1987 NFL Draft.

Prior to playing in the NFL he attended Kearny High School in San Diego California where he currently resides.

References

1964 births
Living people
American football cornerbacks
American football return specialists
Buffalo Bills players
Denver Broncos players
Los Angeles Rams players
New York Jets players
Oregon Ducks football players
Players of American football from San Diego
Kearny High School (California) alumni